The 2021-22 season is Real Kashmir's  fourth season in the I-League.

First Team squad

(on loan from Jamshedpur)

(on loan from Jamshedpur)

Contract Extension

New contracts

Transfers

Transfers in

Transfers out

Pre-season

Competitions

Overview

I-League

League table

Matches 
I-league fixtures were published on 07 december 2021.

IFA Shield

Group stage

Group A

Pre Quarter-finals

Quarterfinals

Semi-final

Final

Goal Scorers

References

2021–22 in Indian football
Real Kashmir FC